The 2014 Capital Football season was the second season under the new competition format in the Australian Capital Territory.  The competition consisted of two divisions across the ACT. The overall premier for the new structure qualified for the National Premier Leagues finals series, competing with the other state federation champions in a final knockout tournament to decide the National Premier Leagues Champion for 2014.

2014 National Premier Leagues Capital Football

The 2014 National Premier League ACT season was played over 18 rounds, beginning on 4 March with the regular season concluding on 24 August 2014.

League table 

Source: foxsportspulse.comRules for classification: 1) points; 2) goal difference; 3) number of goals scored.(C) Champion; (R) Relegated.

Results 
Updated to match(es) played on unknown. Source: Colours: Blue = home team win; Yellow = draw; Red = away team win.For upcoming matches, an "a" indicates there is an article about the rivalry between the two participants.

Finals

Season statistics

Scoring

Top goalscorers

2014 Capital Football Division 1 

The 2014 Capital Football Division 1 was the second edition of the new Capital League as the second level domestic association football competition in the ACT. 10 teams competed, all playing each team in their pool twice for a total of 18 rounds.

League table 

Source: sportstg.comRules for classification: 1) points; 2) goal difference; 3) number of goals scored.(C) Champion.

Finals

2014 Capital Football Division 2 

The 2014 ACT Capital Football Division 2 was the second edition of the new Capital League Division 2 as the third level domestic association football competition in the ACT. 10 teams competed, all playing each team twice for a total of 18 rounds.

League table 

Source: sportstg.comRules for classification: 1) points; 2) goal difference; 3) number of goals scored.(C) Champion.

Finals

2014 Federation Cup 

2014 was the 52nd edition of the Capital Football Federation Cup. The Cup competition was to act as the preliminary rounds for the FFA Cup in the ACT, with the Cup winner entering the subsequent FFA Cup Round of 32. However, because of an appeal by 2013 winners Tuggeranong United, the winner of the 2014 edition of the Cup did not qualify for the 2014 FFA Cup. The Cup competition was open to all senior men's teams registered with Capital Football, and consisted of two rounds, quarter-finals, semi-finals and a final. NPL clubs entered the tournament in the second round. Belconnen clinched the 2014 Cup with a 3–2 victory over Canberra FC.

See also 

Soccer in the Australian Capital Territory
Sport in the Australian Capital Territory

References 

2014 in Australian soccer
2014 in Australian sport